Woodlands is a rural locality in the Lockyer Valley Region, Queensland, Australia.

History 
Woodlands Provisional School opened on 28 March 1897. On 1 January 1909, it became Woodlands State School. It  closed on 12 December 1975. It was at 714 Woodlands Road.

References

Further reading 

 

Lockyer Valley Region
Localities in Queensland